Death Sentence is a 1975 novel by Brian Garfield, the sequel to Death Wish.

Plot introduction
Six months after Death Wish, Paul Benjamin has moved from New York City to Chicago after the death of his catatonic daughter, the result of the brutal attack that transformed him into a vigilante. The only thing that distracts him from his renewed vendetta against crime is a beautiful woman, whom he starts dating. As he leads the double life, a copycat vigilante begins stalking the streets, using a distinctive .45 caliber Luger pistol. Vigilantism soon becomes a rallying cry for the city as the police search for their man before innocent people are hurt. Now, Paul is not after criminals or even justice but a man who is as dangerous as he himself has become.

Film adaptation
Death Wish II (1982) borrows some elements from the book, but ultimately it contrasts with the book's storyline, characters and setting. In 2007, a  film based on the novel (though a completely different storyline) was made, starring Kevin Bacon and directed by James Wan.

Characters
Paul Benjamin – After leaving New York, Paul moves to Chicago to start a new life, but continue his war as he hunts the streets of his new home.
Irene Evans – Paul's new love and a lawyer, she gave up her smoking habit and is Paul's girlfriend, which is the reason of his utter distraction.
Harry Chisum – Irene's former mentor, he suspects Paul being the "Chicago vigilante" to the point on confronting him in his home and explaining why he must end it at once.
Orson Pyne – A college professor, he is killing in the same manner as Paul.
Truett – This gun owner sold two guns to Paul and one to Orson.
Jim Splater – Paul's new employer, he introduces Paul to Chicago.
Michael Ladlow – Chicago local
Dan O'Hara – Chicago local
Captain Victor Mastro – A detective, he is investigating the murders of the muggers.
Captain William Marlowe – Also a detective, he is investigating the muggers' deaths with Mastro.
John Childress – one of Paul's previous co-workers
Joseph Crubb – a dangerous teenager whom Paul stalks for two days before finally tracking down and shooting him
Lloyd Marks – fell into trouble when he encountered a mugger with his daughter, but was saved by Paul, who shot the mugger.
Joanne Marks – The blind daughter of Lloyd Marks, she was threatened by the mugger, but was saved by Paul, who shot the mugger before he could do any harm to her.

Creation

The book was written as a "penance" for the film version of Death Wish.

References

1975 American novels
American thriller novels
Sequel novels
Novels set in Chicago
American novels adapted into films
Death Wish (franchise)